Yang Hormat Dato’ Sheila Majid  (born Shaheila binti Abdul Majid, 3 January 1965), is a Malaysian pop singer who is best known for her 1986 song, "Sinaran".  Her musical prowess especially in the genre of jazz music has led her to be dubbed as Malaysia's Queen of Jazz.

Biography 
Sheila Majid was born in Kuala Lumpur, (then in Selangor state), Malaysia on 3 January 1965. Her mother is a native Malay with Mandailing ancestry whose great-great-grandfather was Sutan Puasa, the founder of Kuala Lumpur. Her father was a Malay of Javanese descent, whose great-grandfather had settled in Malaya after surviving a shipwreck en route to Java from a pilgrimage in Mecca. Her paternal lineage can be traced back to Raden Hussein, brother of Raden Hassan, the first Muslim sultan of Demak; both were princes of Probowo Wijoyo V of Majapahit.

She attended schools at Convent Goodshepherd Kindergarten, Methodist Girls Primary School and Methodist Girls Secondary School, all in Kuala Lumpur, Malaysia.

Personal life 
In 1989, she was married to Roslan Aziz, who was the producer of her previous albums. They have two children from this marriage, Wan Nur Khaleda (born 1991) and Megat Abdul Majid (born 1994), but has since divorced him in 1996. Her daughter, Wan Nur Khaleda also follows her mother's footsteps as a singer, though more into hip hop music under the stage name of 'Kayda'.

Achievements and career highlights

 1985: debut album Dimensi Baru
 1986: second album Emosi locally in Malaysia and also in Indonesia.
 1987: first non-native to win Indonesia's BASF award for Best Female R&B Artist.
 1988: third studio album Warna
 1989:
 wins America's International Star Search Award for Best Female Vocalist.
 performed at the Tokyo Music Festival.
 1990: first Malaysian artist to break into Japan with her albums Emosi and Warna, as well as her single "Sinaran"
 fourth studio album Legenda
 1991: Legenda concert at Stadium Negara in Kuala Lumpur.
 1996: first Malaysian artist to stage a solo show in London's West End at the Royalty Theatre
 Performs at the Ronnie Scott's Jazz Club in London.
 2000: performed at the Petronas Philharmonic Hall in Kuala Lumpur to commemorate her fifteenth anniversary in the music industry.
 sixth studio album Ku Mohon is named Best Pop Album and its title track won Song of the Year at Malaysia's Anugerah Industri Muzik.
 invited to represent Malaysia in Jakarta, Indonesia for a concert entitled Diva SEA
 2004: seventh album Cinta Kita, produced by Warner Music Indonesia, topped the Indonesian pop charts
 2006: re-release of Legenda XV XX album under EMI Malaysia.
 2012: Received "Anugerah Khas Planet Muzik" (Notable Award) in the 11th Anugerah Planet Muzik at the Max Pavilion, Singapore in recognition of her 27 years in music industry.
 2013: regional brand ambassador for Reckitt Benckiser's Strepsils since 1 February.
 2017: first new studio album in 13 years Boneka released.

Honours 
On 24 October 2008, Sheila became the only local artist to receive the Darjah Indera Mahkota Pahang (DIMP) which carries the title of Dato’ in conjunction with the 78th Birthday of the Sultan of Pahang, Sultan Ahmad Shah at the Abu Bakr Palace in Pekan, Pahang.

Honours of Malaysia
 
 Darjah Indera Mahkota Pahang (DIMP) - Dato’

References

External links

 Official site
 Discography

1965 births
Living people
People from Kuala Lumpur
Malaysian women pop singers
Malaysian people of Malay descent
Malaysian people of Javanese descent
People of Batak descent
Mandailing people
Malaysian Muslims
Malay-language singers
Indonesian-language singers
21st-century Malaysian women singers
20th-century Malaysian women singers
Malaysian pop rock singers
Malaysian rhythm and blues singers
Malaysian jazz singers
Malaysian film actresses
Malaysian television actresses
Moroccan people of Malay descent
Saudi Arabian people of Malay descent